Nilofer Saba Azad is an American oncologist and physician-scientist specialized in gastrointestinal, colorectal, cholangiocarcinoma, and pancreaticobiliary cancers. She is a professor at the Johns Hopkins School of Medicine and oversees clinical trials at the Sidney Kimmel Comprehensive Cancer Center.

Life 
Azad earned a M.D. at Baylor College of Medicine in 2001. She completed a residency in internal medicine at Baylor in 2004 and a fellowship in oncology and hematology at the National Cancer Institute (NCI) in 2008. Azad was certified in medical oncology by the American Board of Internal Medicine in 2007.

Azad joined the Sidney Kimmel Comprehensive Cancer Center (SKCCC) in 2008. She is a professor of oncology at Johns Hopkins School of Medicine. At the SKCCC, Azad serves as co-director of the Developmental Therapeutics Clinical Research Program and the Cancer Genetic and Epigenetic Core Research Program. Azad specializes in gastrointestinal, colorectal, cholangiocarcinoma, and pancreaticobiliary cancers. She researches the development of therapeutics and oversees clinical trials using epigenetic therapy, chemotherapy, and cancer immunotherapy. She is a member of both the Epigenetics and Colon Cancer Stand Up 2 Cancer Dream Teams, serving as a Principal on the latter, and has held multiple leadership positions in national and international organizations.

In September 2021, Azad was appointed by U.S. president Joe Biden to serve on the NCI National Cancer Advisory Board.

Azad speaks English and Hindustani.

References

External links
 
 

Living people
Year of birth missing (living people)
Place of birth missing (living people)
Baylor College of Medicine alumni
Johns Hopkins University faculty
Cancer researchers
American oncologists
21st-century American women physicians
21st-century American physicians
21st-century American women scientists
American medical researchers
Physician-scientists
Women medical researchers
Women oncologists
Biden administration personnel